Physics and Beyond is a book by Werner Heisenberg, the  German physicist who discovered the uncertainty principle. It tells, from his point of view, the history of exploring atomic science and quantum mechanics in the first half of the 20th century.

As the subtitle "Encounters and Conversations" suggests, the core part of this book takes the form of discussions between himself and other scientists. Heisenberg says: "I wanted to show that science is done by people, and the most wonderful ideas come from dialog".

With chapters like "The first encounter with the science about atoms", "Quantum mechanics and conversations with Einstein", "Conversation about the relation between biology, physics and chemistry" or "Conversations about language" and "The behavior of an individual during a political disaster", dated 1937–1941, a reader can hear speaking such persons as Erwin Schrödinger, Niels Bohr, Albert Einstein or Max Planck, not only about physics, but also about many other questions related to biology, humans, philosophy, and politics.

Not only that, these conversations are often situated in detailed description of the historical atmosphere and a beautiful scenery, as many of them were led in nature during the many journeys they made, backpacking or sailing. "'Do you see whales, Heisenberg?', 'Yes, I see only whales, but I hope they are only big waves.'", is one of humorous scenes when the author, Bohr and other friends were sailing in a dark night.

The book provides a first-hand account about how science is done and how quantum physics, especially the Copenhagen interpretation, emerged.

"Nobody can reproduce these conversations verbatim, but I believe that the spirit of what the people said, and how they did, is conserved," the author tries to explain in the preface.

Many believe that the golden years of physics around 1925, when "even small people could do big things" are gone. But the people who had been there continue to speak to us through this book.

The book was published first in German 1969, in English as Physics and Beyond (1971) and in  French in 1972 (La partie et le tout).

References

Science books
Books about the history of physics
Quantum mechanics
1969 non-fiction books
Werner Heisenberg